A semi-presidential republic, or dual executive republic is a republic in which a president exists alongside a prime minister and a cabinet, with the latter two being responsible to the legislature of the state. It differs from a parliamentary republic in that it has a popularly elected head of state and from the presidential system in that the cabinet, although named by the president, is responsible to the legislature, which may force the cabinet to resign through a motion of no confidence.

While the Weimar Republic (1919–1933) and Finland (from 1919 to 2000) exemplified early semi-presidential systems, the term "semi-presidential" was first introduced in 1959 in an article by journalist Hubert Beuve-Méry, and popularized by a 1978 work written by political scientist Maurice Duverger, both of whom intended to describe the French Fifth Republic (established in 1958).

Definition 
Maurice Duverger's original definition of semi-presidentialism stated that the president had to be elected, possess significant power, and serve for a fixed term. Modern definitions merely declare that the head of state has to be elected, and that a separate prime minister that is dependent on parliamentary confidence has to lead the executive.

Subtypes 
There are two distinct subtypes of semi-presidentialism: premier-presidentialism and president-parliamentarism.

Under the premier-presidential system, the prime minister and cabinet are exclusively accountable to parliament. The president may choose the prime minister and cabinet, but only the parliament may approve them and remove them from office with a vote of no confidence. This system is much closer to pure parliamentarism. This subtype is used in: Burkina Faso, Cape Verde, East Timor, France, Lithuania, Madagascar, Mali, Mongolia, Niger, Georgia (2013–2018), Poland (de facto, however, according to the Constitution, Poland is a parliamentary republic), Portugal, Romania, São Tomé and Príncipe, Sri Lanka, Turkey (de facto between 2014-2018, until the constitutional amendment to switch the government to presidential from parliamentary), and Ukraine (since 2014; previously, between 2006 and 2010).

Under the president-parliamentary system, the prime minister and cabinet are dually accountable to the president and to the parliament. The president chooses the prime minister and the cabinet, but must have the support of a parliamentary majority for his choice. In order to remove a prime minister, or the whole cabinet, from power, the president can either dismiss them, or the parliament can remove them through a vote of no confidence. This form of semi-presidentialism is much closer to pure presidentialism. It is used in: Guinea-Bissau, Mozambique, Russia, and Taiwan. It was also used in Ukraine (first between 1996 and 2005; then from 2010 to 2014), Georgia (from 2004 to 2013), South Korea under the Fourth and Fifth republics, and in Germany during the Weimar Republic.

Cohabitation 

In a semi-presidential system, the president and the prime minister may sometimes be from different political parties. This is called "cohabitation", a term which originated in France after the situation first arose in the 1980s. Cohabitation can create either an effective system of checks and balances, or a period of bitter and tense stonewalling, depending on the attitudes of the two leaders, the ideologies of themselves/their parties, and the demands of their supporters.

Division of powers 
The distribution of power between the president and the prime minister can vary greatly between countries.

In France, for example, in the case of cohabitation, the president oversees foreign policy and defense policy (these are generally called les prérogatives présidentielles, presidential prerogatives) and the prime minister is in charge of domestic policy and economic policy. In this case, the division of responsibilities between the prime minister and the president is not explicitly stated in the constitution, but has evolved as a political convention based on the constitutional principle that the prime minister is appointed (with the subsequent approval of a parliament majority) and dismissed by the president. On the other hand, whenever the president and the prime minister represent the same political party, which leads the cabinet, they tend to exercise de facto control over all fields of policy via the prime minister. However, it is up to the president to decide how much autonomy is left to said prime minister.

In most cases, cohabitation results from a system in which the two executives are not elected at the same time or for the same term. For example, in 1981, France elected both a Socialist president and legislature, which yielded a Socialist premier. But while the president's term of office was for seven years, the National Assembly only served for five. When, in the 1986 legislative election, the French people elected a right-of-centre assembly, Socialist president François Mitterrand was forced into cohabitation with right-wing premier Jacques Chirac.

However, in 2000, amendments to the French constitution reduced the length of the French president's term to five years. This has significantly lowered the chances of cohabitation occurring, as parliamentary and presidential elections may now be conducted within a shorter span of each other.

Advantages and disadvantages 
The incorporation of elements from both presidential and parliamentary republics can bring certain advantageous elements; however, it also creates  disadvantages, often related to the confusion produced by mixed authority patterns.

Advantages
 Parliament has the ability to remove an unpopular prime minister, therefore maintaining stability throughout the president's fixed term.
 In most semi-presidential systems, important segments of bureaucracy are taken away from the president, creating additional checks and balances where the running of the day-to-day government and its issues are separate from the head of state, and as such, its issues tend to be looked at on their own merits, with their ebbs and flows and not necessarily tied to who the head of state is.
 Having a separate head of government who needs to command the confidence of the parliament is seen as being more in tune to the political and economic development of the country. Because the head of government is elected from the parliament, there is little potential for political gridlock to occur, since the parliament has the power to remove the head of government if needed.

Disadvantages
 The system provides cover for the president, as unpopular policies could be blamed on the prime minister, who runs the day-to-day operations of the government.
 It creates a sense of confusion towards accountability, as there is no relatively clear sense of who is responsible for policy successes and failures.
 It creates both confusion and inefficiency in the legislative process, since the capacity of votes of confidence makes the prime minister respond to the parliament.

Republics with a semi-presidential system of government 

Italics indicate states with limited recognition.

Premier-presidential systems 
The president has the authority to choose the prime minister and the cabinet, but only the parliament may remove them from office through a vote of no confidence. However, even though the president does not have the power to directly dismiss the prime minister or the cabinet, they can dissolve parliament. 

 
 
 
 
 
 
 
 
 
 
 
 
 
  (de facto; de jure a parliamentary republic)
 
 
 
  (de facto; de jure a parliamentary republic)

President-parliamentary systems 
The president chooses the prime minister without a confidence vote from the parliament. In order to remove a prime minister, or the whole cabinet, from power, the president can either dismiss them, or the parliament can remove them through a vote of no confidence. The president also has the authority to dissolve the parliament.

 
 
 
 
 
 
 
 
 
 
  (Nominally a parliamentary republic; the semi-presidential system is based on temporary additional articles)

Former semi-presidential republics

 (1991–1998, 2013–2018)
 (1990–2000)
 (1940–1976)
 (1919–2000)
 (2004–2018)
 (1919–1933)
 (1973–1974)
 (1991–1995)
 (2007–2013)
 (1990–2001)
 (1985–1997, 2003-2010)
 (1978–1986)
 (1991)
 (1990–1991)  
 (1972–1988)
 (2014–2022)
 (1991–1995)

See also 
 List of countries by system of government 
 Parliamentary system
 Presidential system
 Semi-parliamentary system

References

Notes

Citations

Sources

 
 
 
 
 
 Elgie, Robert (2011). Semi-Presidentialism: Sub-Types And Democratic Performance. Comparative Politics. (Oxford Scholarship Online Politics), Oxford University Press

External links 
 Governing Systems and Executive-Legislative Relations. (Presidential, Parliamentary and Hybrid Systems), United Nations Development Programme (n.d.). 
 
 The Semi-Presidential One, blog of Robert Elgie
 Presidential Power blog with posts written by several political scientists, including Robert Elgie.

Political systems
Semi-presidential
Republicanism
Separation of powers
1950s neologisms